Small Change is the fifth studio album by Canadian rock band Prism, released in December 1981 by Capitol Records. It was the first of two Prism studio albums with lead vocalist Henry Small, who had replaced Ron Tabak after his forced departure and the last studio album to feature guitarist and founding member Lindsay Mitchell. The album is generally regarded as the genesis of the smoother, more adult-oriented sound of the band's later work. The album peaked at No. 53 on the Billboard 200.

On release, the album was received favorably by the majority of music critics, although it was criticized for being too commercial. This was a departure from the band's early arena rock roots and opinions became much more negative in subsequent decades. Regardless of the criticism, Small Change became Prism's most commercially successful studio album on the Billboard 200 and it was their first and only album to the make the Top 100. The lead single, "Don't Let Him Know", inspired by the Kim Carnes song "Bette Davis Eyes", was written by Jim Vallance, using his real name instead of the pseudonym Rodney Higgs that he used on previous Prism studio albums, and Bryan Adams. It became Prism's first and only Top 40 hit in the US and went on to peak at number-one on the Billboard Mainstream Rock Tracks chart in 1982. It stayed in the charts for just over four months. The follow-up single, "Turn On Your Radar", was their fifth and final single to chart, peaking at No. 64 on the Billboard Hot 100. Small Change went on to achieve Gold status in Canada (in excess of 50,000 copies sold).

Cover artwork
The album cover depicts Norman Rockwell's 1954 painting, Girl at Mirror. Additionally, the single releases of the songs "Don't Let Him Know" and "Turn On Your Radar" used the same image of the painting.

Background
As the band were thinking about recording their follow-up to the poorly received commercial disappointment Young and Restless in December 1980, Ron Tabak was fired. Various reasons have been cited, including his conflicts with other band members, several run-ins with the law and/or a lack of songwriting ability. A new lead vocalist Henry Small was brought in and the new four-piece line-up (Small/Mitchell/Harlow/Norton) recorded the album Small Change in the summer of 1981, which was released later in the year. Keyboardist John Hall departed the band early on during the sessions for the album.

By the beginning of 1982, Mitchell, Harlow and Norton had left Prism. With Mitchell's departure, Prism now had no original members left.

Critical reception

Reviewing retrospectively for AllMusic, critic Mike DeGagne wrote of the album "Prism substituted its vigorous rock & roll sound for a more refined blend of soft rock amiability, which paid off to some extent." He added that "The vocals are toned down, the extravagance of the horns and synthesizers are absent and the songs reflect a more adult-oriented feel."

Track listing

Personnel
Credits are adapted from the Small Change liner notes.

Prism
 Henry Small – lead vocals
 Lindsay Mitchell – guitar
 Rocket Norton – drums
 Al Harlow – bass guitar

Additional musicians
 Jimmy Phillips – keyboards
 Randy Hansen – guitar
 Norton Buffalo – harmonica
 Alvin Taylor – drums, percussion
 Reggie McBride – bass guitar
 Don Francisco – backing vocals
 Shirley Matthews – backing vocals
 Paulette Brown – backing vocals
 Cleopatra Kennedy – backing vocals

Production and artwork
 John S. Carter – producer
 Warren Dewey – engineer
 Roy Kohara – art direction
 James O'Mara – photography

Sales chart performance
Album – Billboard (North America)

Singles – Billboard (North America)

References

 https://musiccanada.com/gold-platinum/?_paged=772

External links
 

1981 albums
Albums with cover art by Norman Rockwell
Prism (band) albums
Capitol Records albums